The Hazfi Cup 2005-06 is the 19th staging of Iran's football knockout competition.

Quarterfinals

Semifinals

Final 

|}

First Leg

Second Leg

See also 
 2006 Hazfi Cup Final
 2005–06 Iran Pro League
 2005–06 Azadegan League
 2005–06 Iran Football's 2nd Division
 2005–06 Iran Football's 3rd Division
 2005–06 Iranian Futsal Super League
 Iranian Super Cup

References 

2005
2005–06 domestic association football cups
2005–06 in Iranian football